Manoba melanota is a moth in the family Nolidae. It was described by George Hampson in 1900. It is found in Nepal, India (Sikkim, Assam) and Thailand.

References

Moths described in 1900
Nolinae